Guáimaro is a town and municipality in the southern part of Camagüey Province in Cuba. It is located between the cities of Camagüey and Las Tunas.

History
Guáimaro features prominently in Cuban history as the place where in 1869, at the beginning of the Ten Years' War, the Revolutionary Army of Mambises met and created the Guáimaro Constitution for a new nation free from Spanish colonial oppression. The municipality was created in 1943, when it split from Camagüey.

Geography
The municipality is divided into the barrios of Camaniguán, Elia, Galbis, Guáimaro, Palo Seco, Pilar and Tetuán.

Demographics
In 2004, the municipality of Guáimaro had a population of 57,086.

See also

Guáimaro Constitution
Guáimaro Municipal Museum
List of cities in Cuba
Municipalities of Cuba

References

External links

 Camaguey-Guaimaro
 Town history

Populated places in Camagüey Province